Communicourt is a legal services company, based in Birmingham in the West Midlands, United Kingdom. It is one of the two companies providing Non-Registered Intermediaries for defendants in criminal proceedings and respondents in family proceedings in the United Kingdom. The company provides legal intermediaries outside the Witness Intermediary Scheme run by the Ministry of Justice which has not historically provided intermediaries for defendants in court cases. In addition to the provision provided for defendants in the criminal courts, Communicourt offers an intermediary service for vulnerable respondents in the family courts.

Criminal Practice Directions allow the court the discretion to appoint an intermediary for a vulnerable defendant because the Ministry of Justice does not offer this service. Communicourt was founded in 2011 by Naomi Mason, who works as a Registered Intermediary and a Non-Registered Intermediary. The company recruits Speech and language therapists and Psychology graduates with an interest in the legal system, and with relevant and specialist knowledge and experience. Communicourt staff then undergo an extensive Intermediary Training Programme and complete intermediary competencies, alongside ongoing continued professional development (CPD) and excellent professional supervision. Intermediaries are not appropriate adults or expert witnesses whilst undertaking this role.

Young male offenders are at high risk for previously undetected oral language deficits, and this risk increases as severity of offending increases. There are many vulnerable defendants that stand trial requiring professional assistance. Communicourt work closely with the defendant, court personnel and counsel during proceedings. As of November 2018, Communicourt has 30 full-time intermediaries and an administration team.

References 

Companies based in Dudley
2011 establishments in England
Law firms established in 2011